Jaime Antonio Sandoval Rosales (born 12 September 1971) is a Chilean former professional footballer who played as a defender for clubs in Chile and Indonesia.

Career
In his early years as a professional footballer, Sandoval played for Municipal Las Condes and San Antonio Unido in the Chilean Tercera División.

In the Chilean Primera División, he played for Provincial Osorno (1993), Deportes Concepción (1997), Rangers (1998–99, 2001) and Coquimbo Unido (2002–03).

In the second level of the Chilean football, he played for Cobresal (1995–96) and Rangers (2000), with whom he got promotion to the top division.

In his last year, he moved to Indonesia and played for PSIM Yogyakarta (2004), where he scored four goals and coincided with his compatriot César Bravo.

Post-retirement

References

External links
 Jaime Sandoval at PlaymakerStats.com

1971 births
Living people
Footballers from Santiago
Chilean footballers
Chilean expatriate footballers
San Antonio Unido footballers
Provincial Osorno footballers
Cobresal footballers
Deportes Concepción (Chile) footballers
Rangers de Talca footballers
Coquimbo Unido footballers
PSIM Yogyakarta players
Tercera División de Chile players
Chilean Primera División players
Primera B de Chile players
Chilean expatriate sportspeople in Indonesia
Expatriate footballers in Indonesia
Association football defenders